Jan Jaap Korevaar (born May 22, 1957 in Delft) is a former water polo player from the Netherlands. He finished in sixth position with the Dutch team at the 1980 Summer Olympics in Moscow.

References

External links
Jan Jaap Korevaar at Sports Reference

1957 births
Living people
Dutch male water polo players
Olympic water polo players of the Netherlands
Water polo players at the 1980 Summer Olympics
Sportspeople from Delft
20th-century Dutch people